Sozzago (Piedmontese: Sosach) is a comune (municipality) in the province of Novara in the Italian region Piedmont, located about  northeast of Turin and about  southeast of Novara.

Sozzago borders the following municipalities: Cassolnovo, Cerano, Garbagna Novarese, Terdobbiate, and Trecate.

Demographic evolution

References

Cities and towns in Piedmont